The Feminist Alliance Against Rape (FAAR) was formed as a sub-group of the DC Rape Crisis Center in 1974 as a way to network among feminists in the anti-rape movement. FAAR published a monthly newsletter that invited others to join the discussion on violence against women and provided resources and practical information for grassroots organizers.

From the introductory article of the newsletter:
 
Writers for the FAAR newsletter included Larry Cannon and William Fuller, who wrote about prison rape, Deb Friedman, Freada Klein, Linda Kupis, Mary Ann Largen, Sue Lenaerts, and Jackie MacMillan.

FAAR functionally disbanded in 1978.

References

External links 
Deb Friedman collection of feminist anti-violence records at the Sophia Smith Collection, Smith College

Feminism in Washington, D.C.
Feminist organizations in the United States
Rape in the United States
Violence against women in the United States
Women in Washington, D.C.